Belmar is a shopping mall in Downtown Lakewood, Colorado that opened in 2004 as a redevelopment of the Villa Italia Mall.  It is owned and managed by Bridge33 Capital.

There are over 80 stores including Best Buy, DSW, Target, Century Theatres and Sola Salons.

References

https://web.archive.org/web/20160126120040/http://www.starwoodretail.com/starwood-capital-group-buys-class-mixed-use-lifestyle-center-suburban-denver

External links
 Official site

Shopping malls in Colorado
Buildings and structures in Lakewood, Colorado
Shopping malls established in 2004
2004 establishments in Colorado